Maung Mu Paing Shin may refer to:
 Maung Mu Paing Shin (2000 film), a Burmese musical drama romance film
 Maung Mu Paing Shin (1964 film), a Burmese black-and-white drama film